Berlin-Charlottenburg-Wilmersdorf is an electoral constituency (German: Wahlkreis) represented in the Bundestag. It elects one member via first-past-the-post voting. Under the current constituency numbering system, it is designated as constituency 80. It is located in western Berlin, comprising the Charlottenburg-Wilmersdorf borough.

Berlin-Charlottenburg-Wilmersdorf was created for the inaugural 1990 federal election after German reunification. Since 2021, it has been represented by Michael Müller of the Social Democratic Party (SPD).

Geography
Berlin-Charlottenburg-Wilmersdorf is located in western Berlin. As of the 2021 federal election, it comprises the entirety of the Charlottenburg-Wilmersdorf borough excluding the area north of the Spree, specifically the locality of Charlottenburg-Nord and the neighbourhood of Kalowswerder from Charlottenburg locality.

History
Berlin-Charlottenburg-Wilmersdorf was created after German reunification in 1990. In the 1990 through 1998 elections, it was constituency 254 in the numbering system. In the 2002 through 2009 elections, it was number 81. Since the 2013 election, it has been number 80.

Originally, the constituency comprised the entirety of Charlottenburg-Wilmersdorf excluding the Charlottenburg-Nord locality. In the 2002 election, it lost the neighbourhood of Kalowswerder from Charlottenburg locality.

Members
The constituency was first represented by Dietrich Mahlo of the Christian Democratic Union (CDU) from 1990 to 1998. It was won by the Social Democratic Party (SPD) in 1998 and represented by Siegrun Klemmer until 2002, followed by Petra-Evelyne Merkel until 2013. Klaus-Dieter Gröhler of the CDU was elected in 2013, and re-elected in 2017. Michael Müller regained the constituency for the SPD in 2021.

Election results

2021 election

2017 election

2013 election

2009 election

References

Federal electoral districts in Berlin
Charlottenburg-Wilmersdorf
Constituencies established in 1990
1990 establishments in Germany